Rabbi Solomon Hirschell (12 February 1762, London – 31 October 1842, London) was the Chief Rabbi of Great Britain, 1802–42. He is best remembered for his unsuccessful attempt to stop the spread of Reform Judaism in Britain by excommunicating its leaders.

His name is also spelt Hirschel and Herschell.

His father was a Polish Jew from Galicia, Hirschel Levin, Chief Rabbi of London and Berlin and a friend of Moses Mendelssohn. His older brother was the Talmudist Saul Berlin.

He died on 31 October 1842 (27th of Cheshvan 5603), and was buried in the Brady Street Cemetery near Whitechapel in London's East End.

References
"Solomon Hirschel – High Priest of the Jews"
History of the Great Synagogue, Cecil Roth, Chapter XIII:Rabbi Solomon Hirschell and his contemporaries (Susser archive)
 
The British Chief Rabbinate

Specific

1762 births
1842 deaths
English people of Polish-Jewish descent
Chief rabbis of the United Kingdom
English Orthodox rabbis
19th-century English rabbis
Rabbis from London
Date of birth unknown
English people of German-Jewish descent
Burials at Brady Street Cemetery
18th-century English rabbis